The House of Konopacki was a prominent historical family of Prussian nobility whose members served as senators in the Prussian provincial diet, as advisers to the King of Poland, and as Bishops of Chełm.

History 
Between 1454 and 1772 the Konopackis constituted one of the twenty noble Prussian families which formed the Prussian political elite. In this period the family had ten senators in the diet, three of whom were also bishops of Chełm.

Notable members 
Maciej Konopacki (born ?, died 1613) - Royal Secretary to the King of Poland, Chamberlain of Chełm, Voivode of Chełm, Bishop of Chełm.
Jan Konopacki (born ?, died 1530) - Royal Treasures to the King of Poland, Bishop of Chełm, Provost of Malbork
Fabian Konopacki (born ?, died 1619) - Catholic clergyman, Deacon of Warmia, Deacon of Chełm

References

Karin Friedrich, "The Other Prussia: Royal Prussia, Poland and Liberty, 1569-1772", Cambridge University Press, 2006, pg. 25 

People from the Kingdom of Prussia
Polish noble families